The Greene Line was a line of river steamships along the Ohio River. The name was changed in 1973 to Delta Queen Steamboat Company.

History
The company was started in 1890 by Gordon C. Greene with Henry K. Bedford. When Gordon died in 1927 his sons: Christopher Becker Greene, Henry Wilkins Greene, and Thomas R. Greene ran the company. The company name was changed in 1973 to "Delta Queen Steamboat Company".

Ships
H. K. Bedford (1886) was built in 1886 and purchased from the previous owner in 1890 and named after Henry K. Bedford.
Gordon C. Greene (steamboat) (1923) named after Gordon C. Greene
Thomas Greene (steamboat) (1925) named after Thomas R. Greene.
Delta Queen (1924) was built in 1924 and purchased from the previous owner in 1946
Mississippi Queen (steamboat) Built in the 1970s, and is not currently cruising, because it is being stripped, it also has the largest calliope to be put on a steamboat.
American Queen Built in 1994, the largest Steamboat that works, now the flag ship for the American Queen Steamboat Company.

References